"Your Love Is a Miracle" is a song written by Bill Kenner and Mark Wright, and recorded by American country music singer Mark Chesnutt.  It was released in July 1991 as the fourth single from his debut album Too Cold at Home.  It peaked at number 3 in the United States, and number 2 in Canada in their respective Country Music charts.

Content
The narrator tells his lover that her love is a miracle for ending his rambling-man ways and making him settle down.

Music video
The music video was directed by Bill Young and premiered in mid-1991.

Chart performance

Year-end charts

References

 [ Allmusic]

1991 singles
Mark Chesnutt songs
Songs written by Mark Wright (record producer)
MCA Records singles
Song recordings produced by Mark Wright (record producer)
Songs written by Bill Kenner
1990 songs